Herbert James Symington,  (November 22, 1881 – September 28, 1965) was a Canadian lawyer and businessman.

From 1941 to 1947 he was president of Trans-Canada Airlines. He was the founding president of the International Air Transport Association.

1881 births
1965 deaths
Lawyers in Manitoba
20th-century Canadian businesspeople
Canadian Companions of the Order of St Michael and St George
Members of the King's Privy Council for Canada